G. Bhargavan Pillai (1933–2009), was one among the famous Folklore writers from Kerala. He was the Founder Chairman of Kerala Folklore Academy, located at Kannur, Kerala. Pillai's most famous work is Kakkarissinatakam (1976, Malayalam), a book on Kakkarissi Natakam.
Bhargavan Pillai died on 17 April 2009 at the age of 75, in Trivandrum due to illness.

                
Occupation:Folklore writer   
Spouse:Smt. K.G. Leelavathy Amma

Early life 
Pillai was born in Mundakkal family from Kudassanadu, a small village in Alappey district (near Pandalam), Kerala. He earned his degree from Pandalam NSS College in Botany and holds an M.A. from University College of Kerala in Malayalam. After working in All India Radio (AIR) for over 30 years, he retired as the producer in 1991.

Awards and honors 
 Senior Fellowship from Central Government for his research works in traditional art forms of Kerala in 1977.
 Scholarship holder from Indira Gandhi Memorial Trust  (1986).
 Kerala Sangeetha Nadaka Academy Award in 1994.
 Revathi Pattathanam Award in 1996.

Major works 

Some of his major works include:

 Porottu Nadakaum Mattum
 Keralathile Paananmar Paadunnu
 Mathilerikanni Paniyalayil
 Radio Nadakam (Study) 
 Kakkarissinadakam
 Aalayaal Thara Venam (Folk Song)
 Nattarangu: Vikasaum Parinaamavum
 Ithihaasa Puthrikal
 Poomukham
 E.V. yude Jeevacharithram
 Pandalam K.P. - Kavyajeevitham
 Akashavaniyil Innale
 Naadodi Nadakangalude Pinnale

References 

1933 births
2009 deaths
All India Radio people
Indian folklorists
University of Kerala alumni